Guillermo Alcaide and Adrián Menéndez were the defending champions.  Alcaide did not participate.  Menéndez partnered with Jaroslav Pospíšil, losing in the quarterfinals. Walter Trusendi and Matteo Viola won the title defeating Evgeny Donskoy and Andrey Kuznetsov 1–6, 7–6(7–5), [10–3] in the final.

Seeds

Draw

Draw

References
 Main draw

2012 Doubles
Casablanca Doubles